Dejan Davidovac (born 17 January 1995) is a Serbian professional basketball player for CSKA Moscow of the VTB United League.

Playing career 
Davidovac started to play basketball for his hometown's Proleter Naftagas. In the 2011–12 season, he played his first Serbian League season. In 2012, Davidovac signed for Vršac Swisslion.

Davidovac signed for Crvena zvezda and was immediately loaned to FMP in March 2015, just before the start of the Serbian Super League season. On September 30, 2016, Davidovac made his Adriatic League debut for FMP in a 78–76 loss to KK Zadar, making 7 points, 7 rebounds and 3 assists. On February 11, 2017, Davidovac scored an Adriatic career-high 28 points to help defeat Union Olimpija. Through 26 Adriatic League games in the 2016–17 season, Davidovac averaged 10.0 points, 5.1 rebounds, and 2.5 assists per game.

On September 13, 2017, Davidovac signed a four-year contract with the Crvena zvezda. On October 22, 2017, Davidovac made his debut for Crvena zvezda in the Adriatic League against Cedevita, making his 3 points, 3 rebounds and 2 assists in 9 minutes of playing time. Two days later, on October 24, Davidovac made his EuroLeague debut against Russian team Khimki, making two 2-point attempts and a rebound in under 6 minutes of playing time. Through 23 games in the 2017–18 Adriatic season, he averaged 5.6 points, 3.1 rebounds, and 1.9 assists per game. In 24 EuroLeague games, he recorded 6.5 points, 2.0 rebounds, and 1.2 assists per game. Through 17 games in the 2018 Serbian SuperLeague season, Davidovac averaged 7.9 points, 3.9 rebounds, 1.6 assists, and 1.4 steals per game. He won Serbian SuperLeague in the 2017–18 season. Davidovac averaged 6.2 points and 2.9 rebounds per game during the 2019–20 ABA season. On 8 September 2020, Davidovac signed a two-year contract extension with the Zvezda.

On 26 June 2022, Davidovac signed for CSKA Moscow.

National team career 
Davidovac was a member of the Serbian under-18 team that competed at the 2013 FIBA Europe Under-18 Championship in Latvia. Over nine tournament games, he averaged 7.2 points, 5.0 rebounds and 1.1 assists per game. Davidovac was a member of the Serbian under-20 team that won the gold medal at the 2015 FIBA Europe Under-20 Championship in Lignano Sabbiadoro and Latisana, Italy. Over ten tournament games, he averaged 8.7 points, 4.7 rebounds and 1.1 assists per game.

Career statistics

Euroleague

|-
| style="text-align:left;"| 2017–18
| style="text-align:left;" rowspan=4| Crvena zvezda
| 24 || 6 || 15.6 || .543 || .468 || .773 || 2.0 || 1.2 || .7 || .3 || 6.5 || 7.4
|-
| style="text-align:left;"| 2019–20
| 24 || 4 || 18.4 || .540 || .326 || .795 || 2.9 || 0.6 || .8 || .2 || 6.2 || 7.3
|-
| style="text-align:left;"| 2020–21
| 33 || 8 || 22.3 || .566 || .378 || .780 || 2.8 || 1.6 || 1.0 || .2 || 7.2 || 8.3
|-
| style="text-align:left;"| 2021–22
| 28 || 13 || 18.3 || .538 || .352 || .700 || 3.3 || 0.9 || 0.8 || .2 || 5.0 || 7.3

See also 
 List of KK Crvena zvezda players with 100 games played

References

External links
 Profile at euroleague.net
 Profile at aba-liga.com
 Profile at eurobasket.com
 Profile at fiba.com

1995 births
Living people
ABA League players
Basketball League of Serbia players
KK Crvena zvezda players
KK FMP players
KK Proleter Zrenjanin players
KK Vršac players
Point guards
Serbian men's basketball players
Serbia men's national basketball team players
Small forwards
Sportspeople from Zrenjanin